P. M. Abubacker (Poovanitheruvath Maliyekal Abubacker) was one of the Muslim political leaders of Kerala, India, previously a renowned journalist with the Chandrika newspaper in Kozhikode. He represented constituencies Calicut 2 (1982), Koduvally (1987), Guruvayoor (1991) in Legislative assembly of Kerala State.
It was his efforts for KUWJ which brought about pensions for journalists.
His political career in social service extended almost four decades.

He was a part of Thekkepuram community in Kozhikode. His wife was Smt M P Sainabi and they had four sons PM Iqbal, PM Firoz, PM Afsal, PM Mouzzammil and a daughter Shamshad Banu. He died on 17 October 1994.

Positions held
Minister for Public Works from 25-01-1980 to 20-10-1981
Chairman, Committee on Estimates (1991–94)
Vice Chairman, Kerala State Financial Enterprises
Member of the University of Calicut Senate
Member Kerala Khadi Board
President of mavoor Gwoliar rayons STU
Member IUML National Executive
Member Kerala State Muslim League High Power Committee
Councillor, Calicut Corporation (1962–74)
Deputy Mayor, Calicut Corporation
State President, Indian National League
Member of the 3rd, 5th, 6th, 7th, 8th and 9th Kerala Legislative Assembly

Publications
 A Book on Prison Life.

References

 The Great Thekkepuram Achievers
 http://www.eci.gov.in/SR_KeyHighLights/SE_1965/StatisticalReport_1965_Kerala.pdf
 https://web.archive.org/web/20080511103130/http://www.iumlclt.org/muslim_students_federation.php

1994 deaths
Malayalam-language journalists
Malayali politicians
Politicians from Kozhikode
Journalists from Kerala
Kerala MLAs 1980–1982
Year of birth missing